Vadym Viktorovych Ferentsyk (born 18 July 2001) is a Ukrainian professional footballer who plays as a left winger.

References

External links
 
 
 

2001 births
Living people
Place of birth missing (living people)
Piddubny Olympic College alumni
Ukrainian footballers
Association football forwards
FC Uzhhorod players
Ukrainian First League players
Ukrainian Second League players
Ukrainian Amateur Football Championship players